Bonfield is a surname. Notable people with the surname include:

Dawn Bonfield, British materials engineer
James Bonfield (1825–1883), Canadian politician
John Bonfield (1915–1976), British trade unionist
Peter Bonfield (born 1944), British business executive
William Bonfield (born 1937), British material scientist